Jacalitos Creek formerly known as Arroyo de Jacelitos (Creek of Little Huts), is a creek in Fresno County, California.

Its source is 0.96 km (0.6 mi) north of Andrews Peak, in the Diablo Range. From there it runs east then northeast between the Jacalitos Hills and the Kreyenhagen Hills, then passes across Pleasant Valley to its confluence with Los Gatos Creek 4.2 km (2.6 mi) south of Coalinga Nose.

History
Jacalitos Creek, originally known as El Arroyo de Jacelitos, it was the location of watering places on El Camino Viejo, between Los Gatos Creek to the north and Zapato Chino Creek to the south. Jacalitos is derived from a Spanish word, jacal, meaning a hut with a thatched roof and walls consisting of thin stakes driven into the ground close together and plastered with mud.  Modified with the ending -ito, gives it the  meaning "little huts".

References

Rivers of Fresno County, California
Diablo Range
Geography of the San Joaquin Valley
El Camino Viejo
Rivers of Northern California